Dominicans in the United States can refer to:

Dominican American (Dominican Republic), inhabitants of the United States with origins in the Dominican Republic
Dominican American (Dominica), inhabitants of the United States with origins in Dominica
Dominican Order in the United States, members of the Dominican Order